"Space art" (also "astronomical art") is the term for a genre of modern artistic expression that strives to show the wonders of the Universe.  Like other genres, space art has many facets and encompasses realism, impressionism, hardware art, sculpture, abstract imagery, even zoological art.  Though artists have been making art with astronomical elements for a long time, the genre of space art itself is still in its infancy, having begun only when humanity gained the ability to look off our world and artistically depicted what we see out there.  Whatever the stylistic path, the artist is generally attempting to communicate ideas somehow related to space, often including an appreciation of the infinite variety and vastness which surrounds us.  In some cases, artists who consider themselves space artists use more than illustration and painting to communicate scientific discoveries or works depicting space, some have had the opportunity to work directly with space flight technology and scientists in attempts to expand the arts, humanities, and cultural expression relative to space exploration.

Practitioners of the visual arts have for many decades explored space in their imaginations using traditional painting media and many are now using digital media toward similar ends. Science fiction magazines and picture essay magazines were once a major outlet for space art, often featuring planets, space ships and dramatic alien landscapes.  Chesley Bonestell, R. A. Smith, Lucien Rudaux, David A. Hardy and Ludek Pesek were some of the major artists in the early days of the genre actively involved in visualizing space exploration proposals with input from astronomers and experts in the infant rocketry field anxious to spread their ideas to a wider audience. (Indeed, NASA's second administrator, James E. Webb, initiated the space agency's space art program in 1962, four years after its founding.)  A strength of Bonestell's work in particular was the portrayal of exotic worlds with their own alien beauty, often giving a sense of destination as much as of the technological means of getting there.

Astronomical art

Astronomical art is the aspect of space art devoted to visualizing the wonders of outer space. A major emphasis of such art is the space environment as a new frontier for Humanity. Many other works portray alien worlds, extremes of matter such as black holes, and concepts arising from inspiration derived from astronomy.

Astronomical art was largely pioneered in the 1940s and 50s by the abilities of Chesley Bonestell to solve formidable perspective problems, paint with the eye of a master matte artist to create a realistic visual impression, and to seek out the greatest experts in the fields which fascinated him. His work helped inspire many in the post war era to think about space travel, which seemed fantastic before the V-2 rocket. To this day numerous artists assist in bringing ideas into presentable form in the space community, both in portraying the latest ideas on how to leave Earth and in showing wonders awaiting us out there.

Astronomical art is the most recent of several art movements which have explored the ideas emerging from ongoing exploration of Earth, (Hudson River School, or Luminism) the distant past, (ancient history and prehistoric animal art) and the steadily revealed universe. Most Astronomical artists use traditional painting methods or digital equivalents in a way which brings the viewer to the frontiers of human knowledge gathered in the exploration of space. Such works usually portray things in the familiar visual language of realism extrapolated to exotic environments whose details reflect ongoing knowledge and educated guesswork. An example of the process of creating astronomical art would be studying and visiting desert environments to experience something of what it might be like on Mars, and painting based on such experience. Another would be to hear of something likely to be amazing to watch close up, then seeking out published articles or experts in the field. Usually there is an artistic effort to emphasize the favorable visual elements just as a photographer composes a picture. The best astronomical art shares with the viewer what it is that catches the artists imagination about the subject portrayed.

Science fiction magazines such as Fantasy and Science Fiction, Amazing, Astounding (later renamed Analog), and Galaxy served as a major outlet for the work of space and particularly astronomical artists in the 1950s. The several picture essay magazines of the time such as Life, Collier's, and Coronet   were other major outlets for such art. Today astronomical art can be seen in magazines such as Sky and Telescope, The Planetary Report and occasionally in Scientific American. The NASA fine arts program has been an ongoing effort to hire artists to create works generally specific to a particular space project. The program documents of historical events in recognizable form by professional artists. The NASA Fine Arts Program operated in the era of seemingly unlimited progress at the time of the first head of that program, James Dean, although even then pictorial realism seemed a subset rather than a dominating visual influence.

The works which document space flight situations such as those referenced above are similar in concept to government efforts during World War II to send artists to battle zones to document things as they saw it, much of which appeared in contemporary Life magazines.

Another close parallel to astronomical art is dinosaur art. Both art schools explore unreachable realms with the intent to bring a sense of reality to them. The 'Grand Masters' of that field such as Charles R. Knight and Zdeněk Burian worked with experts in the field, using the best available information to create a realistic vision of something we can never behold with our own eyes.  Ideally, as with Astronomical art, such a work tries to show what is known about the subject, with some educated guesswork to fill in the unknown and unknowable. We see more recent works by a healthy number of great dinosaur artists which reflect the growth in knowledge in body stances and likely feathers, etc. just as we see alien landscapes now painted which reveal the gathered knowledge instead of the craggy fantasies and the 'blue sky' Mars of yesteryear. Most of today's widely published space and astronomical artists have belonged to the International Association of Astronomical Artists since 1983.

Historic influences

{| border="1" cellspacing="2" cellpadding="5"
|- valign="top"
| 1301 || Giotto di Bondone painting The Adoration of the Magi includes a comet in the sky, believed to indicate the appearance of Halley's Comet in 1301 
|- valign="top"
| 1416 || Limbourg brothers in the Duc Du Berry manuscript includes what may be the earliest attempt at a realistic portrayal of the night sky, complete with zipping meteors.
|- valign="top"
| 1515 || Albrecht Dürer publishes the first known perspective drawing of Earth as a globe.
|- valign="top"
| 1529 || Albrecht Altdorfer painting Battle of Issus is probably the earliest painting to show the curvature of the Earth from a great height. 
|- valign="top"
|1711 || Donato Creti paints a series of astronomers of the time under views of the planets through a telescope, to interest the Vatican in establishing an astronomical observatory.
|- valign="top"
|1858 || Comet Donati was recorded in numerous paintings of the time
|- valign="top"
|1874 || James Carpenter and James Nasmyth The Moon: Considered as a Planet, a World, and a Satellite contains photographs of sculpted models of Lunar features, influential to future space artists in the marked vertical exaggeration of the actual relief of the Moon.
|- valign="top"
|1870s || Étienne Léopold Trouvelot publishes series of Chromolithographs of his pastels of astronomical subjects.
|- valign="top"
|1877 ||Paul Dominique Philippoteaux  and engraver Laplante illustrate Jules Verne's story Off on a Comet, including an imaginative view looking up at the rings of Saturn from the planet itself.
|- valign="top"
|1918 || Howard Russell Butler deliberately makes use of the dynamic range of human vision in painting a total eclipse based on direct observation.
|- valign="top"
|1927 ||Scriven Bolten creates Lunar landscape images for the Illustrated London News using painted photos of plaster models
|- valign="top"
|1937 || Lucien Rudaux paints many works for Sur Les Autres Mondes
|- valign="top"
|1944 || Chesley Bonestell paintings of Saturn seen from its different moons appears in Life magazine, introducing astronomical art to a wide American audience. Books featuring Bonestells art include The Conquest Of Space (1949), The Exploration Of Mars (1956) and Life'''s The World We Live In (1955)
|- valign="top"
|1952 ||
Second Hayden Planetarium Symposium on Space Travel, held in New York in October 1952, resulted in a series of widely read space flight articles in Colliers magazine illustrated by Bonestell and others
|- valign="top"
|1963 || Ludek Pesek paintings fill the large volumes The Moon And the Planets, and the 1968 volume Our Planet Earth-From The Beginning|- valign="top"
|1980 || Cosmos PBS television show and book uses the work of many space artists. Sagan used such art in several of his books.
|}

Photography

The cosmos contains many sources of visual inspiration that our growing abilities to gather and propagate has spread through the mass culture.  The first photographs of the entire Earth by satellites and manned Apollo missions brought a new sense of our world as an island in empty space and promoted ideas of the essential unity of Humanity.  Photographs taken by explorers on the Moon shared the experience of being on another world.  The famous Pillars of Creation Hubble Space Telescope and other Hubble photos often evoke intense responses from viewers, for example Hubble's planetary nebula images.

Artistry
Space artists may work closely with space scientists and engineers to help them to visualize and develop their scientific and technological concepts of making the dream of space exploration a reality.  Other forms of pictorial space art bring the viewer to inner visions inspired directly or otherwise by the fruits of the expanding vision of Humanity.  Some aspects of such art pay visual homage to outer space, popular ideas of life on other worlds including alien visitation visions, dream symbology, psychedelic imagery and other influences on contemporary visionary art.

Now that artists have experienced free-fall conditions during flights flown with NASA, the Russian and French Space Agencies, and with the Zero Gravity Arts Consortium, new methods of artistic expressions unknowable today will unfold as artists imagine new ways to utilize microgravity environments to create artistic works.  Although such dreams await substantial opportunity, early efforts by artists to have art pieces placed in space have already been accomplished with painting, holography, microgravity mobiles, floating literary works, and sculpture.

Art in space

First art created in space
The first active artist in space was Alexei Leonov, producing the first drawing in space onboard Voskhod 2 in 1965, depicting an orbital sunrise.

First original oil paintings flown in outer space
An art conservation experiment from Vertical Horizons, founded by Howard Wishnow and Ellery Kurtz, was flown aboard the Space Shuttle Columbia STS-61-C January 12, 1986.  Four original oil paintings by American artist Ellery Kurtz were flown in one of NASA's Get Away Special (G.A.S.) container mounted to a bridge in the shuttle cargo bay. These original works of art are the first oil paintings to enter Earth orbit. This NASA GAS canister, designated G-481, was the 46th such canister flown aboard a Space Shuttle.  The Space Shuttle Columbia orbited the Earth 98 times during its mission duration time of 6 days, 2 hours, 3 minutes and 51 seconds. Columbia was launched from Kennedy Space Center, Cape Canaveral, Florida, on January 12, 1986, and landed at the Kennedy Space Center on January 18, 1986.

Zero-g space art
Another work, later brought to Earth-orbit sometime in the mid-80s, was a radiant study of the golden sunlight on a Soviet space station by Russian artist Andrei Sokolov, carried aboard the Soviet Mir space station starting with modules in February 1986.  In 1984 Joseph McShane and in 1989 Lowry Burgess had their conceptual artworks flown aboard the Space Shuttle utilizing NASA's 'Get Away Special' program.  The first sculpture specifically designed for a human habitat in orbit was Arthur Woods' Cosmic Dancer which was sent to the Mir station in 1993.  In 1995, Arthur Woods organized  Ars ad Astra - the 1st Art Exhibition in Earth orbit consisting of 20 original artworks from 20 artists and an electronic archive also took place on the Mir space station as a part of ESA's EUROMIR'95 mission.  In 1998, Frank Pietronigro flew Research Project Number 33: Investigating The Creative Process in a Microgravity Environment where the artist drew, created 'drift paintings' and danced in microgravity space.  In 2006, the artist returned to microgravity flight to create three new works, one in collaboration with Lowry Burgess, Moments in the Infinite Absolute, Flags in Space! and a new form of microgravity mobile.

The Slovenian theater director Dragan Živadinov  staged a performance called Noordung Zero Gravity Biomechanical during a parabolic flight organized through the Yuri Gagarin Cosmonaut Training Center facility in Star City in 1999. The UK arts group The Arts Catalyst, with the MIR consortium (Arts Catalyst, Projekt Atol, V2_Organisation, Leonardo-Olats) organised a series of parabolic 'zero gravity' flights for artistic and cultural experimentation with the Gagarin Cosmonaut Training Centre, as well as with the European Space Agency, between 2000 and 2004, including Investigations in Microgravity, MIR Flight 001, and MIR Campaign 2003.HighBeam Artists who participated in these flights and visits to Russia and ESA have included the Otolith Group, shortlisted in 2011 for the Turner Prize, Stefan Gec, Ansuman Biswas and Jem Finer, Kitsou Dubois, Yuri Leiderman, and Marcel.li Antunez Roca.

The Mexican artist and musician Nahum directed the art and science project Matters of Gravity (La Gravedad de los Asuntos in Spanish), a project reflecting on gravity by its absence. The first mission consisting only of Latin American artists was executed in a zero gravity flight at the Yuri Gagarin Cosmonaut Training Centre in 2014. The participating artists include Tania Candiani, Ale de la Puente, Ivan Puig, Arcángelo Constantini, Fabiola Torres-Alzaga, Gilberto Esparza, Juan Jose Diaz Infante, Nahum and Marcela Armas. The project included the participation of Mexican scientist Miguel Alcubierre and curators Rob La Frenais and Kerry Anne Doyle.

Small art objects have been carried on several Apollo missions, such as gold emblems and a small Fallen Astronaut figurine that was left on the Moon during the 1971 Apollo 15 mission.  Visual observations have been recorded in drawings and commentary by earlier Cosmonauts and Astronauts of difficult to photograph phenomena such as the airglow, twilight colors, and outer details of the Solar corona. An able and observant artist can record aspects of the surroundings beyond the design limitations of any particular camera system.

Performance art has also occurred in space, as with Chris Hadfield's edited performance of David Bowie's 1969 song "Space Oddity".

Sojourner 2020 project onboard the International Space Station
In 2020 Sojourner2020 project from MIT, Space exploration Initiative took 9 selected artist to develop art projects on board the International Space Station, the Sojourner2020 was (a 1.5U size unit, 100mm x 100mm x 152.4mm ) that was launched into low Earth orbit between March 7 and April 7, during COVID-19 pandemic. It featured a three-layer telescoping structure that created three different “gravities”: zero gravity, lunar gravity, and Martian gravity. Each layer of the structure rotated independently. The top layer remained still in weightlessness, while the middle and bottom layers spun at different speeds to produce centripetal accelerations that mimicked lunar gravity and Martian gravity, respectively. Each layer carried 6 pockets that held the projects. Each pocket was a container with 10mm in diameter and 12mm in depth. The artist proposed and accomplished artworks in a variety of different mediums, including carved stone sculpture by Erin Genia, liquid pigment experiments by Andrea Ling and Levi Cai, sculptures made of transgender hormone replacement meds by Adriana Knouf, and living organisms, like marine diatoms of the genus Phaeodactylum Tricornutum, by Luis Guzmán.

The nine artist groups selected onboard Sojourner2020 were:

· Luis Bernardo Guzmán - bioarchitectures (Cosmoecology) - Chile

· Xin Liu, Lucia Monge - Unearthing the Futures - China and Peru

· Levi Cai & Andrea Ling - Abiogenetic Triptych - USA, Canada

· Kat  Kohl - Memory Chain: A Pas de Deux of Artifact - USA

· Henry Tan - Pearl of Lunar - Thai

· Janet Biggs - Finding Equilibrium - USA

· Masahito Ono - Nothing, Something, Everything - Japan

· Adriana Knouf - TX-1 - USA

· Erin Genia - Canupa Inyan: Falling Star Woman - American Sisseton Wahpeton Oyate Artworks launched into outer space 
 The Contour of Presence by Nahum
 Orbital Reflector by Trevor Paglen
 Enoch by Tavares Strachan
 Moon Gallery by the Moon Gallery Foundation

Space art organizations

International Association of Astronomical Artists

The premier organization and only guild in the world dedicated to the creation of space art is the International Association of Astronomical Artists (IAAA).  Composed of over 120 members, artists of the IAAA depict the wonders of the Universe in ways to inspire the greater human population and raise awareness of space.  Members of the IAAA have been creating space art in all of its myriad forms since its founding in 1982, from traditional painting to digital works to 3-D zero-gravity sculpture.  Numerous book and magazine covers, movie effects, or artistic images illustrating the newest astronomical discoveries are done by an IAAA member.

 KOSMICA Institute 
KOSMICA is an institute that runs poetical, artistic, cultural and critical projects about outer space activities and their impact on the Earth. KOSMICA's central activity is a series of festivals worldwide with over 20 editions in various countries. Also, KOSMICA constantly develops further activities such as  educational programs, and publishing. It has local offices in several cities as well as partner organizations.

See also
List of space artists
List of space art related books
Time capsule

References

 Further reading 
 Space Art, Ron Miller, Starlog Magazine Visions of Space,  David A. Hardy, Paper Tiger 1989
 Worlds Beyond: The Art of Chesley Bonestell, Ron Miller & Frederick C. Durant, III
 Star Struck: One Thousand Years of the art of Science and Astronomy, Ronald Brashear & Daniel Lewis, 2001 Univ. of Washington Press
 Futures: 50 Years in Space, David A. Hardy & Patrick Moore, AAPPL 2004Out of the Cradle: Exploring the Frontiers beyond Earth, William K. Hartmann, Ron Miller and Pamela Lee (Workman Publishing, 1984)
 Space Art: How to Draw and Paint Planets, Moons, and Landscapes of Alien Worlds, Michael Carroll, 2007 Watson Guptil/Random House
 The Impact of American and Russian Cosmism on the Representation of Space Exploration in 20th Century American and Soviet Space Art'', Kornelia Boczkowska, Wydawnictwo Naukowe UAM, 2016

External links 

International Association of Astronomical Artists
 numerous space art site links

 
Space advocacy
Spaceflight
Visual arts genres